This is a list of earthquakes in the Solomon Islands archipelago, which includes the nation state of Solomon Islands and Bougainville within Papua New Guinea. Only earthquakes over magnitude 8 are included unless they result in damage and/or casualties. Earthquakes from other regions that were strongly felt in the area are also be included.

Background
The Australian Woodlark, Solomon Sea and Pacific Plates are converging at a rate of 97 mm/yr. The earthquake was a result of interaction between the Australian and Pacific Plates along a subduction zone. Subduction of the Australian Plate has also given rise to volcanoes in the region. This region of the world lies along the Pacific Ring of Fire, where 90 percent of all earthquake and volcanic activity is concentrated here.

Overall, the population in this region resides in structures that are vulnerable to earthquake shaking, though some resistant structures exist. The predominant vulnerable building types are adobe walls and informal construction.

List of earthquakes

References

Earthquakes in the Solomon Islands
Solomon
Earthquakes